Christopher John Sumner AM (born 17 April 1943) is a former Australian politician.

Sumner, who holds a Bachelor of Arts and a Bachelor of Law and was a barrister and solicitor before entering politics, was elected to the South Australian Legislative Council for the Labor Party in 1975. In May 1979 he was appointed 43rd Attorney-General of South Australia and Minister of Prices and Consumer Affairs. In September he became Leader of the Opposition in the Legislative Council following the government's defeat. When Labor returned to office in 1982 he resumed his previous offices in addition to Ethnic Affairs. In 1983 he added Agriculture, Fisheries and Forests to his responsibilities, and in 1989 exchanged Ethnic Affairs and Consumer Affairs for Crime Provention. In September 1993 he became Minister for Justice and Correctional Services. Labor was defeated in 1993 and Sumner once again led the Opposition in the Legislative Council, holding the shadow portfolios of Attorney-General, Education, Public Sector Reform and Consumer Affairs until his resignation from the Legislative Council in 1994.

References

 

1943 births
Living people
Members of the South Australian Legislative Council
Australian Labor Party members of the Parliament of South Australia
Attorneys-General of South Australia
Members of the Order of Australia